The headspot moray (Gymnothorax cephalospilus) is a moray eel found in the Pacific and Indian Oceans. It was first named by Böhlke and McCosker in 2001.

References

cephalospilus
Fish described in 2001